David Stephen Knight (January 16, 1928 – December 20, 2020) was an American film and television actor who worked for many years in Britain. He began his screen career as a contract player for the Rank Organisation who used him as the male lead in several of its productions. He was married to the Scottish actress Wendy McClure (1930–2022).

Selected filmography

Film
 The Young Lovers (1954)
 Out of the Clouds (1955)
 Eyewitness (1956)
 Lost (film) (1956) 
 Across the Bridge (1957)
 Battle of the V-1 (1958)
 Clue of the Twisted Candle (1960)
 A Story of David (1961)
 The Devil's Agent (1962)
 Nightmare (1964)

Television
 A Mask for Alexis (1959)
 Interpol Calling (1960)
 Sergeant Cork (1966)
 Mrs Thursday (1966)
 The Newcomers (1966-67)
 Emergency-Ward 10 (1967)

References

Bibliography
 Ryall, Tom. Anthony Asquith. Manchester University Press, 2013.
 Spicer, Andrew. Sydney Box. Manchester University Press, 2006.

External links

1928 births
2020 deaths
People from Niagara Falls, New York
American male film actors
American male television actors
American emigrants to the United Kingdom